The Call of the Jungle (German: Der Dschungel ruft) is a 1936 German adventure film directed by and starring Harry Piel and also featuring Paul Henckels, Ursula Grabley and Gerda Maurus. It was shot at the Johannisthal Studios in Berlin with sets designed by the art directors Karl Vollbrecht, Erich Grave and Artur Günther. Location shooting took place on Rügen in the Baltic Sea. It was based on a 1930 novel by Georg Mühlen-Schulte and features a hero in the style of Tarzan. The film premiered at the UFA-Palast am Zoo.

Synopsis
The wealthy American Dina Morris and her friends are travelling on a yacht on the Indian Ocean and land and head into the jungle where the encounter Bobby Roeder who lives there in harmony with the animals and the locals. He is attracted to Dana, despite his friendship with Rose, the daughter of a butterfly researcher who lives in the vicinity. Things her out of hand when William Edwards, a member of Dina's party begins shooting animals sacred to the locals.

Cast
 Harry Piel as Bobby Roeder
 Paul Henckels as 	Professor Helmer
 Ursula Grabley as Rose - seine Tochter
 Gerda Maurus as 	Dina Morris
 Alexander Golling	as 	William Edwards, Jäger
 Philipp Manning as Banker Clark
 Ewald Wenck as 	Brown
 Anita Düwell	as 	Elinor
 Emmy Wyda as  Mrs. Joyce
 Thea Fischer	 as  Mary Joyce, ihre Tochter	
 Erik Ode	as 	Charly Kelly
 Elisabeth Eygk	as Maud		
 Raimund Warta		as  Grace, Jagdbegleiter von Edwards
 Bruno Ziener as Rechtsanwalt Petterson
 Egon Brosig	as Sir Timothy, Schmetterlingssammler
 Sophie Eschenbach	as 	Kitty
 Friedrich Ettel	as Kapitän

References

Bibliography 
 Reimer, Robert C. & Reimer, Carol J. The A to Z of German Cinema. Scarecrow Press, 2010.
 Rentschler, Eric. The Ministry of Illusion: Nazi Cinema and Its Afterlife. Harvard University Press, 1996.
 Waldman, Harry. Nazi Films in America, 1933-1942. McFarland, 2008.

External links 
 

1936 films
Films of Nazi Germany
German adventure films
1930s adventure films
1930s German-language films
Films directed by Harry Piel
Tobis Film films
1930s German films
Films based on German novels
Films shot at Johannisthal Studios
Films set in India

de:Der Dschungel ruft